Kevin Drew (born September 9, 1976) is a Canadian musician and songwriter who, together with Brendan Canning, founded the expansive Toronto baroque-pop collective Broken Social Scene. He was also part of the lesser-known KC Accidental, which consisted of Drew and Charles Spearin, another current member of Broken Social Scene.

Drew has shared in the direction of Broken Social Scene videos under the name Experimental Parachute Movement.  In 2008 he wrote and directed a short film called "The Water," inspired by and starring his bandmate and former girlfriend Leslie Feist. In 2009, Drew contributed to the AIDS benefit album Dark Was the Night produced by the Red Hot Organization.

Drew grew up in west Toronto and attended the Etobicoke School of the Arts, along with Metric's Emily Haines, Stars' Amy Millan and novelist Ibi Kaslik, where he, Amy and Emily studied drama.  He was married to Jo-ann Goldsmith, a social worker and an occasional trumpet player in BSS.

Drew's second solo album, Darlings, was released on March 18, 2014.

On January 15, 2013, Drew announced in an interview that he had begun working on a new album with The Archies songwriter Andy Kim. The album, It's Decided, was released in 2015.

Drew's third solo album, Influences, was released on July 16, 2021. He wrote the album while staying in England during 2020, using a music making smartphone app called Endlesss. The album was recorded and mixed on Drew's return to Canada.

Production
Drew and Dave Hamelin coproduced The Tragically Hip's album Man Machine Poem, and Gord Downie's subsequent solo album Secret Path.

Drew also produced Downie's final album Introduce Yerself and Reuben and the Dark's third album, un love.

Discography

Solo
Spirit If... (2007)
Darlings (2014)
Influences (2021) (as K.D.A.P.)

Broken Social Scene
Feel Good Lost (2001)
You Forgot It in People (2002)
Bee Hives (2004)
Broken Social Scene (2005)
Forgiveness Rock Record (2010)
Hug of Thunder (2017)

KC Accidental
Captured Anthems for an Empty Bathtub - (1998)
Anthems for the Could've Bin Pills - (2000)

Videography

Experimental Parachute Movement
Apostle of Hustle
Cheap Like Sebastian
Broken Social Scene
Ibi Dreams of Pavement (A Better Day)
Almost Crimes (with Chris Mills)
Cause=Time
Fire Eye'd Boy
Constantines
Our Age'' 2009
Stars
Your Ex-Lover is Dead
Bitches in Tokyo
Still Life Still
Pastel
The Most Serene Republic
Content Was Always My Favourite Colour
 The Water (2009) Starring Cillian Murphy, David Fox & Feist

References

External links
 Official Site
 Interview with Kevin Drew on kevchino.com
 Kevin Drew Interview with No Tofu by Kelly O'Rourke
 with Kevin Drew at Prefix
 Interview with Kevin Drew on AOL Music Canada

1976 births
Living people
Musicians from Toronto
Canadian indie rock musicians
Arts & Crafts Productions artists
People from Etobicoke
Broken Social Scene members
Canadian record producers
Canadian male singer-songwriters
Juno Award for Songwriter of the Year winners
City Slang artists
21st-century Canadian male singers